John David Kelly (October 9, 1934 – October 21, 1998) was a United States circuit judge of the United States Court of Appeals for the Eighth Circuit.

Early life and education 

Born in Grand Forks, North Dakota, Kelly earned an Artium Baccalaureus degree in 1956 from Saint John's University in Collegeville, Minnesota and a Juris Doctor in 1959 from the University of Michigan Law School.

Professional career 

A lieutenant in the United States Air Force, Kelly worked as an attorney in the Office of General Counsel at The Pentagon from 1959 until 1962. Kelly returned to North Dakota in 1962. From 1962 until joining the federal bench in 1998, Kelly worked in private legal practice in Fargo, North Dakota, at the Vogel Law Firm. He served as president of the firm for his final 20 years with the firm.

Federal judicial service 

On January 27, 1998, President Bill Clinton nominated Kelly to a seat on the United States Court of Appeals for the Eighth Circuit to replace Judge Frank J. Magill, who had taken senior status in April 1997. The United States Senate confirmed Kelly in a voice vote on July 31, 1998, received his commission on August 3, 1998 and commenced service on August 26, 1998.

Death 

Shortly after being sworn in, Kelly fell ill with an infection in mid-October 1998 and was taken to the Mayo Clinic. On October 21, 1998, Kelly died in Rochester, Minnesota, before his investiture had taken place. He was survived by his wife, Tish, and three grown children.

References

Sources

1934 births
1998 deaths
Judges of the United States Court of Appeals for the Eighth Circuit
United States court of appeals judges appointed by Bill Clinton
University of Michigan Law School alumni
People from Grand Forks, North Dakota
Military personnel from North Dakota
North Dakota lawyers
20th-century American judges